Camillo Pabis Ticci (1920–2003) was an Italian bridge player. He joined the national Blue Team in 1963 and played in the Bermuda Bowl tournament with Giorgio Belladonna, whose long-time partner Walter Avarelli was unavailable. From 1964 he played with Massimo D'Alelio, winning 8 world championship titles.

Born in Florence, Pabis-Ticci was an engineer by profession. For many years he wrote "a bridge column in the magazine l'Europeo which was the most successful of its kind in Italy". Beside the Arno  that he and D'Alelio used, he developed the standard system of Tuscany, in effect.

Books 

 I princìpi del bridge (Milano: Biblioteca universale Rizzoli, 1975-1977), 2 volumes 
 Smazzate in evidenza e ricordi in vetrina: in appendice I problemi di re Nabob, Guido Barbone and Pabis Ticci (Milano: Mursia, 1976), 399 pp. 
 Il bridge è un gioco d'azzardo? (Roma: Marraro, 1979), 254 pp.

Bridge accomplishments 
World championships
Pabis Ticci won eight world championships, all as one of six players on the Italy open .
 Bermuda Bowl (5) 1963, 1965, 1966, 1967, 1969
 World Open Team Olympiad (3) 1964, 1968, 1972 

Runners-up: none. Italy did not finish second between 1951 and 1976.

European championships
Pabis Ticci did not win the European Teams Championship, as the Blue Team did four times from 1956 to 1959. Italy qualified for every Bermuda Bowl from 1961 to 1970 as defending champion and Blue Team members did not generally play for Italy at the European level.

Runners-up
 European Open Teams (2) 1962, 1963

References

External links 

 
 Worldcat search: 'pabis ticci, camillo' 

1920 births
2003 deaths
Italian contract bridge players
Bermuda Bowl players
Contract bridge writers
Sportspeople from Florence
Date of birth missing
Date of death missing
Place of death missing